This is a list of notable shopping centres in Zimbabwe.

Bulawayo
 Bulawayo Centre

Harare
 Eastgate Centre

 
Zimbabwe
Shopping malls